Fredonia is an unincorporated community in Licking County, in the U.S. state of Ohio.

History
Fredonia was laid out in 1829. A post office was established at Fredonia in 1837, and remained in operation until 1900.

Notable people

 Woody English, (1906–1997) was a baseball player with the Chicago Cubs and the Brooklyn Dodgers.

References

Unincorporated communities in Licking County, Ohio
1829 establishments in Ohio
Populated places established in 1829
Unincorporated communities in Ohio